Hutton Roof is a civil parish in the South Lakeland District of Cumbria, England. It contains ten  listed buildings that are recorded in the National Heritage List for England.  All the listed buildings are designated at Grade II, the lowest of the three grades, which is applied to "buildings of national importance and special interest".  The parish contains the village of Hutton Roof, and is otherwise entirely rural.  The listed buildings consist of farmhouses, farm buildings. houses, a church, and a war memorial.


Buildings

References

Citations

Sources

Lists of listed buildings in Cumbria